On Thursday, January 17, 2002 a Palestinian gunman, 24-year-old Abdul Salaam Sadek Hassouneh, killed six people and wounded 33 at a bat mitzvah celebration in Hadera, Israel.

Attack
The attack took place at 9:45 pm (GMT+2) as guests were departing. The al-Aqsa Martyrs' Brigades  assumed responsibility for the attack, claiming it was vengeance for the killing of its leader Raed Karmi. An Israeli police spokesman said the man, apparently on a suicide mission, had thrown several grenades into the Armon David wedding hall, where the Bat Mitzvah celebration had taken place, and detonated explosives on himself. A belt filled with explosives was found on the attacker.

Media coverage 
Al Jazeera was criticized for bias in coverage of the massacre for not including in their coverage that the victims were attending a bat mitzvah and that the gunman crashed the event at a crowded banquet hall.

Perpetrator 
The al-Aqsa Martyrs Brigades said the attacker, 24-year-old Abdel Salam Hassouna, was from a village near Nablus and launched the attack to avenge the death of Raed Karmi.

After the attack a video made earlier by the attacker was released, in which he is seen declaring: "I am doing this to avenge all the Palestinian martyrs."

Official reactions 

Involved parties

:
 The Palestinian Authority condemned the attack but blamed Israel for provoking it.

International
 : the US government condemned the Hadera attack "in the strongest possible terms," calling it a "horrific act of terrorism." The widow of the one American killed in the attack, Aharon Ellis, brought a lawsuit against the Palestinian Authority that received a $173 million default judgment in 2006, and in 2009 was settled out of court.

See also
 List of massacres in Israel
 Palestinian political violence
 Passover massacre
 List of terrorist incidents, 2002

References

External links 
 Seven killed in attack in Israel - published on BBC News on January 18, 2002
 Seven Suicide terrorist kills 6 at Bat Mitzvah in Israel  - published on the New York Post on January 18, 2002

Attacks in Asia in 2002
Suicide bombings in 2002
Spree shootings in Israel
Israeli casualties in the Second Intifada
Fatah
Mass shootings in Israel
Suicide bombing in the Israeli–Palestinian conflict
Deaths by firearm in Israel
Hadera
January 2002 crimes
January 2002 events in Asia
2002 mass shootings in Asia
Massacres in Israel during the Israeli–Palestinian conflict
Massacres in 2002
Terrorist incidents in Israel in 2002